The British Egg Industry Council is an organisation set up in 1986 to represent the British egg industry. It currently has 11 member organisations including the British Egg Products Association, the National Farmers Union and the British Free Range Egg Producers Association (BFREPA). The BEIC operates the British Egg Information Service, which promotes the consumption of eggs to the public.

Lion Mark

The main marketing activity of the British Egg Information Service is the Lion Quality Mark scheme. This is a mark that can be stamped onto eggs by producers who are signed up to its Lion Quality Code of Practice. The code of practice requires that all laying hens must be vaccinated against Salmonella enteritidis and also places certain welfare, feeding, traceability and freshness standards upon producers. The Lion Mark however is not necessarily a sign that the eggs are organic or free range. As of 2009, the British Egg Information Service claims that 84% of eggs produced in the UK are produced to Lion standards.

See also
 Egg Marketing Board - Predecessor to the BEIC and the initial creator of the Lion Mark.

External links
British Egg Information Service
Egg Recipes - British Lion eggs
Lion Mark scheme
British Free Range Egg Producers Association

References

Standards organisations in the United Kingdom
Food safety organizations
Agricultural marketing organizations
Egg organizations
Organizations established in 1986
1986 establishments in the United Kingdom
British food and drink organisations